Judge Cummings may refer to:

Samuel Ray Cummings (born 1944), judge of the United States District Court for the Northern District of Texas
Walter J. Cummings Jr. (1916–1999), judge of the United States Court of Appeals for the Seventh Circuit